The Russian Football Union (Rossiyskiy Futbolnyy Soyuz or RFS) is the official governing body of association football in the Russian Federation. With headquarters in Moscow, it organizes Russian amateur and professional football, including the men's, women's, youth, beach soccer, futsal and Paralympic national teams. The RFS sanctions referees and football tournaments for the Russian Premier League and other football leagues in Russia. RFS is headed by Aleksandr Dyukov, the CEO of Gazprom Neft.

Structure
The RFS is governed by a board of directors led by a chairman, Nikita Simonyan, and a director general, Aleksandr Alayev. The RFU is a member of international football bodies FIFA and UEFA, and also has a relationship with the International Olympic Committee (IOC).

History

Russian Empire
The All-Russian Football Union (VFS) was created on 19 January 1912 and in the same year was admitted to FIFA. The Unions initially consisted of 52 organizations across the Russian Empire. All-Russian Football Union was the organizer of Russian Empire national football team.

Soviet Union 
In 1934, the Football Federation of USSR was formed initially under the name the Football Section of Soviet Union. Its organization was in accordance with the Declaration of the All-Union Council of Fitness Culture of USSR on 27 December 1934. The Section was admitted to FIFA as the Soviet organization in 1946, and admitted to UEFA in 1954. Later the Section was reorganized as the Football Federation of USSR. Concurrently with the Section and later Federation until 1972 there operated the Football Directorate of the Soviet Sport Committee which was subordinated directly to the Soviet Ministry of Sport. The Directorate was never recognized on the international level.

Russian Federation
With the fall of the Soviet Union, the modern Russian Football Union was formed (a constituent conference took place on 8 February 1992), inheriting everything from the previous associations such as the VFS and Football Federation of USSR and reinstated in FIFA on 3 July 1992. In July 1992, the Russian national football team was formed.

Russian invasion of Ukraine
Due to the 2022 Russian invasion of Ukraine, FIFA and UEFA suspended all Russian teams, whether national representative teams or clubs, until further notice.

After the invasion of Ukraine, Adidas suspended its long-term kit partnership with the Russian Football Union, which first began in 2008. Adidas had provided all Russian teams with kits and had expanded the federation’s replica kit sales in the retail market.

During the ban, talk circulated that the RFU were considering seeking to change confederations to the Asian Football Confederation, according to Match-TV broacaster Dmitry Pirog, stating, "I think the time has come to think seriously about a switch to the Asian football confederation." However, Vyacheslav Koloskov opposed the idea, noting that it would "bring the death of Russian football and also we would never return to the European family." In any event, the switch would have to be ratified by other Asian federations, including Japan. RFU president Alexander Dyukov ruled out the idea of switching to Asian football and stated that the RFU is part of UEFA and will always be so. In late November 2022, Dyukov said, at an executive board meeting on behalf of TASS, that the possibility of a switch of the association to the AFC might be considered. On 29 December 2022, the RFU will discuss on Friday to resign from UEFA to join the AFC. On 30 December, following the meeting, Dyukov stated: "We are indeed considering the option of returning to UEFA competitions as soon as possible", "It is important for us to take part in the 2026 World Cup qualifiers".

Presidents

Chairmen of All-Russian Football Union
 Arthur McPherson (January 1912 – 1914)
 Robert Fulda (deputy chairman)
 Georges Duperron (deputy chairman)
 Robert Fulda (1914–1915)

Chairmen of USSR Football Federation
 Vyacheslav Koloskov (January 1990 – 1991)
 Lev Lebedev (May 1989 – January 1990)
 Boris Topornin (December 1980 – May 1989)
 Boris Fedosov (March 1973 – December 1980)
 Valentin Granatkin (June 1968 – March 1973)
 Leonid Nikonov (January 1968 – June 1968)
 Vladimir Moshkarkin (July 1967 – January 1968)
 Nikolai Riashentsev (January 1964 – July 1967)
 Valentin Granatkin (6 May 1959 – January 1964)

Chairmen of Football Section of the USSR (27 December 1934 – 6 May 1959) 
 Valentin Granatkin (1950 – 6 May 1959)
 Mikhail Kozlov (1937 – 1950)
 Aleksei Sokolov (27 December 1934 – 1937)

Chairmen of the Football Directorate of the Soviet Sports Committee (27 December 1934 – 1972) 
 Valentin Antipyonok (dates unknown)
 Alexander Starostin (1956–1958)
 Alexander Starostin (1937–1941)

Russian Football Union
 Vyacheslav Koloskov (8 February 1992 – 2 April 2005)
 Vitaly Mutko (2 April 2005 – 24 November 2009)
 Nikita Simonyan (24 November 2009 – 3 February 2010) 
 Sergei Fursenko (3 February 2010 – 25 June 2012)
 Nikita Simonyan (25 June 2012 – 3 September 2012) 
 Nikolai Tolstykh (3 September 2012 – 31 May 2015)
 Nikita Simonyan (31 May 2015 – 2 September 2015) 
 Vitaly Mutko (2 September 2015 – 25 December 2017)
 Aleksandr Alayev (25 December 2017 – 19 December 2018) 
 Sergey Pryadkin (19 December 2018 – 21 February 2019) 
 Alexander Dyukov (22 February 2019 – present)

References

External links
Football Union of Russia Website 
 Russia at FIFA site
 Russia at UEFA site

Russia
Football in Russia
Football
Articles containing video clips
Sports organizations established in 1912
Sports organizations established in 1992
1912 establishments in the Russian Empire
1992 establishments in Russia